David J. Zuckerman (born August 28, 1962) is an American television producer and writer and is best known as the original showrunner and executive producer of the animated comedy series Family Guy, as well as the creator of the American adaptation of the Australian television series of the same name, Wilfred.

A native of Danville, California, Zuckerman is a graduate of the University of California, Los Angeles. Zuckerman first wrote for the sitcom The Fresh Prince of Bel-Air, and then went on to write and produce episodes for the Fox animated series King of the Hill. In 1999, along with writer and producer Seth MacFarlane, he developed another Fox animated series, entitled Family Guy. He subsequently worked on MacFarlane's second series, American Dad!, before adapting the Australian live action series Wilfred and producing it under the same name for FX.

Early life and education
Zuckerman was born and raised in Danville, California, and is a graduate of Monte Vista High School. He also has a degree from University of California, Los Angeles. He has German-Jewish ancestry.

Career
Zuckerman began his career as a creative executive for Lorimar-Telepictures and NBC. He then began writing full-time when he was hired for a staff job on 1990 NBC sitcom The Fresh Prince of Bel-Air. As a writer and producer, he helped play a key role in the launch of the first seasons of the Fox animated series King of the Hill, which he wrote for from 1997 until 1999, before leaving to develop the series Family Guy. Zuckerman was partnered with Seth MacFarlane, the creator of Family Guy, and served as the series's original showrunner, though has not a single writing credit.

Afterward, Zuckerman was brought in to develop the Fox animated series American Dad!, also created by MacFarlane. He would also go on to create two short-lived network series, as well as an internet show. In 2011, Zuckerman created the American adaptation of the Australian television series of the same name, entitled Wilfred, for the cable network FX, starring Elijah Wood and Jason Gann.

Personal life
In 1985, Zuckerman appeared as a contestant on the game show Sale of the Century, winning $2,800 in cash and prizes.

Zuckerman was married to film and television director Ellie Kanner. They have two sons, Zachary and Adam, and are now divorced. He belonged (along with his former wife) to the Kehillat Israel Reconstructionist Congregation of Pacific Palisades.

Filmography

References

External links

1962 births
Showrunners
Television producers from California
Jewish American writers
American television writers
American male television writers
American people of German-Jewish descent
Living people
People from Danville, California
University of California, Los Angeles alumni
Screenwriters from California
21st-century American Jews
Jewish American comedy writers